The Mrs. Brown, You've Got a Lovely Daughter EP by Herman's Hermits is the band's second EP and was released in the United Kingdom by EMI/Columbia (catalogue number SEG 8440.) It entered the Record Retailer EP Chart week ending June 12, 1965 and peaked at No.3.

Track listing
Side 1
"Mrs. Brown, You've Got a Lovely Daughter" (Trevor Peacock) - 2:48
"I Know Why" (Derek Leckenby, Charles Silverman)

Side 2
"Show Me Girl" (Gerry Goffin, Carole King)
"Your Hand in Mine" (Harvey Lisberg, Silverman)

References

External links
 plutomusic.com

Herman's Hermits albums
1965 EPs
EMI Records EPs